Shuricheh, also rendered Shurijeh may refer to:
 Shuricheh-ye Olya
 Shuricheh-ye Sofla